Hyalopecten is a genus of marine bivalve molluscs.

The placement of the genus Hyalopecten is currently uncertain. Habe included Hyalopecten within the subfamily Camptonectinae. However, Hyalopecten lacks antimarginal microsculpture, which is a key characteristic of Camptonectinae. Some authors consider Ciclopecten Seguenza, 1877 to be a senior synonym, however Ciclopecten has antimarginal microsculpture.

Species and their distribution
Hyalopecten frigidus (Jensen, 1904) - North Atlantic and Arctic Ocean
Hyalopecten hadalis (Knudsen, 1970) - Kermadec Trench
Hyalopecten mireilleae Dijkstra, 1995 - Eastern New Caledonia to the New Hebrides
Hyalopecten neoceanicus (Dall, 1908) - Eastern Pacific coast from Oregon to northern Peru, including the Galapagos Islands
Hyalopecten profundicola (Okutani, 1962) - Aogashima Island, Japan
Hyalopecten pudicus (E. A. Smith, 1885) - Northern Atlantic to the Antarctic
 = fragilis Jeffreys, 1876
 = undatus Verrill & Smith in Verrill, 1885
 = dilectus Verrill & Bush in Verrill, 1898
Hyalopecten strigillatus (Dall, 1889) - Gulf of Mexico to northern Brazil
Hyalopecten tydemani (Dijkstra, 1990) - Indonesia

References
 Raines, B. K. & Poppe, G. T. (2006): The Family Pectinidae. In: Poppe, G. T. & Groh, K.: A Conchological Iconography. 402 pp., 320 color plts., ConchBooks, Hackenheim, . 

Pectinidae
Bivalve genera